Sweethearts is a game show series that aired on ITV for one series from 31 March until 23 June 1987 and was produced by Anglia Television, the show was hosted by Larry Grayson and announced by John Benson.

Gameplay
A panel of three celebrities faced three couples. Each couple had a story about how they met, two of them were false, the other was real. Each couple came out and were questioned by the panel, who would attempt to guess who was faking.

The series was poorly received and never took off, and as a consequence was not renewed for a second series.

American version
Sweethearts later became an American game show with Match Game panellist Charles Nelson Reilly as the host (sometime substituted by Richard Kline). The series ran briefly in syndication from 12 September 1988 until 8 September 1989.

References

External links

1987 British television series debuts
1987 British television series endings
1980s British game shows
British panel games
Television series by ITV Studios
Television shows produced by Anglia Television
English-language television shows
Television game shows with incorrect disambiguation